The QwaQwa National Park is part of the Golden Gate Highlands National Park and the Maloti-Drakensberg Park and comprises the former Bantustan (homeland) of QwaQwa. It is approximately 60 km from Harrismith on the Golden Gate Road (R712) and formed an integral part of the Highlands Treasure Route.

History
The QwaQwa National Park area is the historical home of the Bakoena and the Batlokoa people. QwaQwa was established as a park in 1992 during South Africa's transition to democracy. The goal of the park’s creation was to involve the local community in national projects.The park was reincorporated into the Free State province in 1994. The South African Development Trust (SADT) had already purchased additional land to the north and northwest of QwaQwa in 1984 to reduce localised overcrowding. Additional land of the QwaQwa Farms was leased to black farmers or taken over by the QwaQwa agricultural development corporation. Under the South African Government's Land Reform Programme, the QwaQwa Bantustan was dissolved. The remaining SADT was proclaimed as the QwaQwa National Park in January 1992 according to section 18(1) of the Qwaqwa Nature Conservation Act (No. 5) of 1976. 
 
The 22 000 hectare park was previously enclosed with fencing before being removed to allow for the free movement of 3 000 game animals. QwaQwa National Park was initially managed by the Highlands Development Corporation (HDC), a government business enterprise. The HDC headed the Rand Water Project which has various economic development proposals in QwaQwa as well as the eastern Free State.
 
Agrico, another government-owned enterprise, took over the QwaQwa National Park in 1995. As the farm occupies the former Bantustan, agricultural labourers remained in the area when the park was proclaimed. The residents resisted attempts by the park managers to reduce their domestic animal stocks and to relocate residents to areas outside of the park perimeter. The majority of the residents living in QwaQwa were descendants of farm labourers on white-owned farms until the land was purchased by the SADT. Conflict between the Park management and community members arose when no formal recognition was made of the cultural and economic relevance of the land occupied by the residents. Their resistance was also related to various ancestral grave sites which residents refused to move. Eventually, with the rise in the number of game animals, the Park management managed to limit domestic livestock levels to 15 large stock units per household to control soil erosion and other associated environmental problems. Residents were also requested to cut down their use of water and the harvesting of indigenous medicinal plants. As the park was also a site for the Rand Water project that employed many residents, residents suffered conflicts with the QwaQwa Park management. Eventually some community residents decided to relocate their cattle to graze on the land of black beneficiaries of the land reform programme. However, most residents continue to graze their cattle in the Park.

Climate
The area is located in a summer rainfall area with rainfall and thunderstorms occurring between November and April. Summers are warm with temperatures averaging 26 °C. Winters, from May to October, are dry and cold with temperatures dropping to 13 °C (55 °F). Thick frost is common in the region during the winter months, and snowfall can occur in mid winter due to the altitude.

Vegetation
The park is in the highveld region with the Lesotho highlands in the south. The vegetation comprises species of the Grassland biome. Many species of flora found in these biomes are endemic to South Africa. The area is filled with a large variety of flora found mostly during spring and autumn. The grassy plains of the area are filled with indigenous lilies such as watsonia, gladioli, arums and scilla.

Wildlife 
There is a large variety of mammals found in the reserve, namely Springbok, Burchell's zebra, Eland, Black Wildebeest, Blesbok, and Red Hartebeest. The bird life is equally diverse, and the park is a breeding ground to the endangered Cape Vulture. In addition, there are numerous species of reptiles and insects.

Mammals 

Mammals in the area include the:

Birds

Activities
The park offers bird watching, game tours, guided horse riding and a two-day hiking trail which spans 27 kilometres. There is also a tour of the Basotho Cultural Village.

Basotho Cultural Village Tour 
The Basotho Cultural Village offers an opportunity for visitors to experience South Sotho culture and history, including the household implementation and symbolism in traditional attire. Traditional homesteads from the 1700s have been reconstructed and are on site.

See also
Sotho people
Land reform in South Africa
Sterkfontein dam
Clarens, Free State
Bethlehem

Notes 
This park will be included into the Maloti-Drakensberg Transfrontier Conservation Area Peace Park.

External links
http://www.saexplorer.co.za/south-africa/map/Olifantshoek_map.asp
http://www.sahra.org.za/sites/default/files/website/articledocs/NC%20palaeotechnical%20report.pdf

See also 
Department of Economic development, Tourism and Environmental affairs, Free State Province. webpage

References 

National parks of South Africa